George Howard Vocke (March 16, 1915 – September 8, 1998) was an American professional basketball player, active from 1939–1948. He played for the Akron Goodyear Wingfoots in the National Basketball League and averaged 4.5 points per game.

References

1915 births
1998 deaths
Basketball players from New York City
Akron Goodyear Wingfoots players
American men's basketball players
United States Navy personnel of World War II
Guards (basketball)
St. John's Red Storm men's basketball players